Uchidanurinae is a subfamily of springtails in the family Neanuridae. There are at least three genera and at least one described species, Denisimeria caudata, in Uchidanurinae.

Genera
These three genera belong to the subfamily Uchidanurinae:
 Assamanura Cassagnau, 1980
 Denisimeria Massoud, 1964
 Uchidanura Yosii, 1954

References

Further reading

 

Neanuridae
Arthropod subfamilies